Hakata may refer to:

Hakata-ku, Fukuoka, a ward in Fukuoka Prefecture, Japan
Hakata ningyō (literal translation: "Hakata doll"), traditional Japanese clay dolls, originally from Hakata
Hakata dialect
Hakata Station, a large train station in Fukuoka 
Hakata, Ehime, a town on one of the islands in the Inland Sea, northeast of Imabari
 Hakata, a nickname for the German Eastern Marches Society, a German nationalist organization
 Hakata, a Southern Africa, form of divination or fortune telling using bones or dicemostly associated with the Shona people of Zimbabwe.  
 Hakata Bay, a bay on the Japanese island of Kyūshū
 Battle of Bun'ei, also known as the First Battle of Hakata Bay, during the first Mongol invasions of Japan
 Battle of Kōan, also known as the Second Battle of Hakata Bay, during the second Mongol invasion of Japan